Route 157 is a short highway in Adair County, Missouri.  Its northern terminus is at Route 6 west of Kirksville; its southern terminus is at Thousand Hills State Park.  It runs less than five miles (8 km) and there are no towns on the highway.

Route description
Route 157 begins at the marina on Forrest Lake in Thousand Hills State Park in Adair County, heading north as a two-lane undivided road. The road curves northwest and heads through forested areas of the state park. The route continues north and leaves the state park, passing through more forests with some homes. Route 157 comes to its northern terminus at an intersection with Route 6 west of Kirksville.

Major intersections

References

157
Transportation in Adair County, Missouri